The voiceless palatal nasal is a type of consonantal sound, used in some spoken languages. The equivalent X-SAMPA symbol is J_0.

The equivalent X-SAMPA symbols are n_-' or n_-_j and J_0_+, respectively. A non-IPA letter  (devoiced , which is an ordinary "n", plus the curl found in the symbols for alveolo-palatal sibilant fricatives ) can also be used.

Features 

Features of the voiceless palatal nasal:

Occurrence

See also 
 Index of phonetics articles

Notes

References

External links
 
 

Palatal consonants
Nasal consonants
Pulmonic consonants
Voiceless consonants